Gareth Andre Theodore Henry (born 10 August 1991) is a Jamaican badminton player. He competed at the 2014 Commonwealth Games; and 2011 and 2015 Pan American Games. Henry was part of the national team that won the men's team bronze at the 2018 Pan Am Men's Team Championships. Partnered with Samuel O’Brien Ricketts, he clinched the men's doubles gold at the 2018 Central American and Caribbean Games.

Personal life 
Her sister, Geordine Henry also a professional badminton player. They teamed-up and won the mixed doubles title at the Jamaican National Badminton Championships six times from 2008 to 2016.

Achievements

Pan Am Championships 
Men's doubles

Central American and Caribbean Games 
Men's singles

Men's doubles

Mixed doubles

BWF International Challenge/Series (8 titles, 7 runner-up) 
Men's singles

Men's doubles

Mixed doubles

  BWF International Challenge tournament
  BWF International Series tournament
  BWF Future Series tournament

References

External links 
 

1991 births
Living people
People from Mandeville, Jamaica
Jamaican male badminton players
Badminton players at the 2014 Commonwealth Games
Commonwealth Games competitors for Jamaica
Badminton players at the 2011 Pan American Games
Badminton players at the 2015 Pan American Games
Badminton players at the 2019 Pan American Games
Pan American Games competitors for Jamaica
Central American and Caribbean Games gold medalists for Jamaica
Central American and Caribbean Games silver medalists for Jamaica
Central American and Caribbean Games bronze medalists for Jamaica
Competitors at the 2010 Central American and Caribbean Games
Competitors at the 2014 Central American and Caribbean Games
Competitors at the 2018 Central American and Caribbean Games
Central American and Caribbean Games medalists in badminton
20th-century Jamaican people
21st-century Jamaican people